Alan Brodrick, 2nd Viscount Midleton (31 January 1702 – 8 June 1747) was a British peer and significant cricket patron who was jointly responsible for creating the sport's earliest known written rules.

Cricket patronage
Midleton succeeded his father Alan Brodrick, 1st Viscount Midleton in the viscountcy on 29 August 1728. Before succeeding he made his mark as a cricket patron by arranging important matches against his friend Charles Lennox, 2nd Duke of Richmond.

Records have survived of two such games that took place in the 1727 season. These two games are highly significant because Richmond and Brodrick drew up Articles of Agreement beforehand to determine the rules that must apply in their contests. These were itemised in sixteen points. It is believed that this was the first time that rules (or some part of the rules as in this case) were formally agreed, although rules as such definitely existed. The first full codification of the Laws of Cricket was done in 1744. In early times, the rules would be agreed orally and subject to local variations; this syndrome was also evident in football until the FA was founded, especially re the question of handling the ball. Essentially the articles of agreement were around residential qualifications and ensuring that there was no dissent by any player other than the two captains.

One of Brodrick's matches against Richmond is believed to have been held at Peper Harow, the family seat of the Brodrick family, which is near Godalming. A local club still plays there and it is the location of a point-to-point racecourse.

Viscountcy and family
Brodrick was the son of Alan Brodrick, 1st Viscount Midleton and his wife Lucy (née Courthope), who died in 1703. His succession was unexpected since his elder half-brother St John Brodrick (died 1728) died only a few months before their father. He married Lady Mary Capel, daughter of Algernon Capell, 2nd Earl of Essex and Lady Mary Bentinck, on 7 May 1729.

The 2nd Viscount was a Commissioner of the Customs and subsequently Joint Comptroller of British Army accounts. He in turn was succeeded by his son George as 3rd Viscount. The title is extant (in 2012) and held by Alan Henry Brodrick, 12th Viscount Midleton (b. 1949).

References

Bibliography
 
 
 
 
 
 
 

1702 births
1747 deaths
Midleton, Alan Brodrick, 2nd Viscount
Cricket patrons
18th-century philanthropists